Agnese Possamai (born 17 January 1953 in Lentiai) is a retired middle-distance runner from Italy. Her greatest achievements were the 1985 World Indoor silver medal as well as three European Indoor gold medals.

Biography
She won eleven medals at senior level (9 individual, 2 team) at the international athletics competitions. Her personal best times are 4:08.84 (1500 metres) and 8:37.96 (3000 metres). She has 60 caps in national team from 1977 to 1988.

Achievements

National titles
Agnese Possamai has won 24 times the individual national championship.

Italian Athletics Championships
800 metres: 1978, 1979 (2)
3000 metres: 1982, 1983, 1984, 1985, 1987 (5)
1500 metres indoor: 1979, 1980, 1981, 1984, 1986 (5)
3000 metres indoor: 1982, 1983, 1984 (3)
cross country running: 1978, 1980, 1981, 1982, 1984, 1985, 1986 (7)
Italian Mountain Running Championships
Mountain running: 1980, 1981 (2)

See also
 Italy national athletics team - Multiple medalists
 Italian Athletics Championships - Women multi winners
 Italy national athletics team - Women's more caps
 Italian all-time top lists - 800 m
 Italian all-time top lists - 1500 m

References

External links
 

1953 births
Living people
Sportspeople from the Province of Belluno
Italian female middle-distance runners
Italian female mountain runners
Olympic athletes of Italy
Athletes (track and field) at the 1980 Summer Olympics
Athletes (track and field) at the 1984 Summer Olympics
World Athletics Championships athletes for Italy
Mediterranean Games gold medalists for Italy
Mediterranean Games silver medalists for Italy
Athletes (track and field) at the 1979 Mediterranean Games
Athletes (track and field) at the 1983 Mediterranean Games
Athletes (track and field) at the 1987 Mediterranean Games
Mediterranean Games medalists in athletics
World Athletics Indoor Championships medalists
Italian Athletics Championships winners